William Kirnan (January 4, 1880 – January 30, 1948) was an American politician from New York.

Life
He was born on January 4, 1880, in Brooklyn. He attended Holy Name Parochial School. During the Spanish–American War he served in the U.S. Army.

Kirnan was a member of the New York State Assembly (Kings Co., 7th D.) in 1931, 1932, 1933, 1934, 1935, 1936, 1937, 1938, 1939–40 and 1941. He resigned his seat on January 31, 1941, to run for the State Senate seat vacated by the death of John J. Howard.

Kirnan was elected on March 11, 1941, to the New York State Senate, and remained in the Senate until 1946, sitting in the 163rd, 164th (both 5th D.) and 165th New York State Legislatures (13th D.).

He died on January 30, 1948, at his home at 516 Seventeenth Street in Brooklyn.

Sources

1880 births
1948 deaths
Politicians from Brooklyn
Democratic Party members of the New York State Assembly
Democratic Party New York (state) state senators
20th-century American politicians